Sparrow may refer to:

Birds
 Old World sparrows, family Passeridae
 New World sparrows, family Passerellidae
 two species in the Passerine family Estrildidae:
 Java sparrow
 Timor sparrow
 Hedge sparrow, also known as the dunnock or hedge accentor in the family Prunellidae

People
 Sparrow (surname)
 Sparrow (American poet) (born 1953), American poet, activist, musician, and rabble-rouser
 Alex Sparrow, also known as Alexey Vorobyov (born 1988), Russian singer and actor
 Robert Brown (footballer, born 1856), Scottish footballer known by the nickname 'Sparrow'
 The Little Sparrow (La Môme Piaf), the nickname of French singer Édith Piaf (1915 –1963)

Media

Films
 The Sparrow (1914 film), a 1914 French silent film
 Sparrows (1916 film), a Dutch film
 Sparrows (1926 film), starring Mary Pickford
 The Sparrow (1972 film), Arabic title Al Asfour, a 1972 Egyptian film by director Youssef Chahine
 Sparrow (1993 film), a 1993 Italian drama film directed by Franco Zeffirelli
 Sparrow (2008 film), a Hong Kong film 
 Sparrow (2010 film), a horror film directed by Shaun Troke
 Sparrows (2015 film), an Icelandic film directed by Rúnar Rúnarsson

Literature
 The Sparrow (novel), a 1996 science fiction novel by Mary Doria Russell
 The Sparrow (1967 play), by Alan Ayckbourn
 The Sparrow (2007 play), about a teenage girl with a troubled past

Music
 Sparrows (album), by Anathallo, 2002
 Sparrow (album), by Ashley Monroe, 2018
 The Sparrows (band), a predecessor band to Steppenwolf that included John Kay
 Sparrows (band), a Canadian post hardcore trio
 Sparrow Quartet, American acoustic music group
 Sparrow Records, a record label

Songs 
"Sparrow" (Marvin Gaye song), 1977
"Sparrow" (Emeli Sandé song), 2019
"Sparrows" (Cory Asbury song), 2020
 "Sparrow", by The Boo Radleys from Everything's Alright Forever
 "Sparrow", by Charlotte Church from Three
 "Sparrow", by Mo-dettes from The Story So Far
 "Sparrow", by Simon & Garfunkel from Wednesday Morning, 3 A.M.
 "Sparrow", by Jordan Smith, which represented Kentucky in the American Song Contest
 "Sparrows", by Jason Gray from Where the Light Gets In
 "Sparrows", by Spratleys Japs from Pony
 "The Sparrow", by Mastodon from The Hunter

Other media
 Sparrow (TV series), a 2016 Chinese television series
 Gary Sparrow, a character from Goodnight Sweetheart
 Jack Sparrow, a character from the Pirates of the Caribbean film series

Ships
 , the name of various ships of the British Royal Navy
 , a United States Navy coastal minesweeper in commission from 1940 to 1941
 , a United States Navy patrol boat in commission from 1918 to 1919

Technology
 Sparrow (email client), an e-mail client for Mac OS X and iOS
 Sparrow (target missile), an Israeli air-launched target missile
 AIM-7 Sparrow, an American air-to-air missile
 CallAir A-9 Sparrow, an agricultural aircraft
 Carlson Sparrow, an ultralight aircraft
 Corbin Sparrow, a battery-powered electric vehicle or "micro car"
 Paladin Sparrow, an American powered parachute design
 Vortech Sparrow, an American gyroplane design
 Sea Sparrow missile
 Supermarine Sparrow, a British two-seat light aircraft designed by R. J. Mitchell
 AN/APQ-64 Sparrow II, a type of radar
 Beresheet, lunar lander formerly known as "Sparrow"
 IE 2700 and 2750 Classes (nicknamed Sparrow), Diesel Multiple Units in service in Ireland
Sparrow (bot) is an artificial intelligence-powered chatbot developed by researchers at DeepMind

Other uses
 R v Sparrow, a Canadian judicial decision, and its "Sparrow test"
 Sparrow Lake, Ontario, Canada
 Sparrow, the Chinese name for Mahjong
 "The Sparrows", a nickname of the 79th Light Anti-Aircraft Battery, a Royal Artillery unit of the British Army
 Sparrow, a bowling term for 3 spares in a row

See also
 
 The Sparrows (disambiguation)
 Sparrho, a search engine

Animal common name disambiguation pages